Sunshine Music Tours And Travels is a 2016 Indian road comedy-drama film, directed by Shailendra Singh (in his directorial debut) and produced by Hayre Entertainment and Percept Picture Company. The film revolves around the story of two young boys who are chasing their dreams and take up a road journey from Kashmir to Goa along with several strangers. The film features an ensemble cast of debutantes, including Sunny Kaushal. The film was shot in Kashmir, Delhi, Jaipur, Ahmedabad and Goa, while using real time footage of the Sunburn festival of 2015.

Cast 
 Sunny Kaushal as Sunburn
 Ashrut Abhinan Jain as Rajma Romeo	
 Farhana Bhat as Kashmiri actress
 Jaswinder Singh as Sr. Sodhi
 Suhas Joshi as Peter Baba
 Himayat Sayed as Driver
 Divyajyotee Sharma as Pushpa 
 Subha Rajput as Loveleen
 Nida Chakaborty as Kiran
 Deepak Kalra as Karan the Blogger
 Mayank Kalra as Pratab Singh Thakur  
 Sooraj Ohri as Ayushmaan  Singh
 Ruchi malviya as DJ Aman
 Poonam Gurung as Kara
 Ajit Singh Arora as Jr. Sodi 
 Sundip Ved as Arjun Kamthe
 Ketan Raste as Cop
 Sanjay Kota as Ghungru

References

2010s Hindi-language films
2016 films